Bradden Inman (born 10 December 1991) is a professional footballer who plays as an attacking midfielder for  club Gold Coast Knights. Inman represented Scotland at the under-19 and under-21 international levels, but has subsequently been called up in squads for the Australia national team.

Club career

Newcastle United
The Adelaide-born footballer moved to England at 14 years of age to link up with the Newcastle United Academy.

Inman progressed with the junior levels at Newcastle United and was promoted to the club's reserve team football in the 2008–09 season after signing his first years scholarship with the club. He then signed a three–year contract with the club. Inman quickly became regular for the club's reserve team football. On two occasions, Inman has been named on the substitutes bench for the first team: the first coming against Manchester City for a Premier League fixture in January 2009 and other coming in the League Cup at Peterborough United in September 2009.

Ahead of the 2010–11 season, Inman was included in Newcastle United's pre–season tour and was featured once in a match against Carlisle United. Then in February 2012, he signed a one–year contract extension with the club. For the rest of his Newcastle United's career, Inman spent his time at the club's reserve.

At the end of the 2012–13 season, Inman was offered a new contract by the club. Amid to the contract offered, he was included in the club's pre–season tour. However over the summer, he turned down a contract, due to "considering his options".

Crewe Alexandra (loan)
On 22 November 2012, Inman joined League One outfit Crewe Alexandra on loan until January 2013. He previously turned down a loan move to Gateshead.

The loanee midfielder was named as an unused substitute for the league victory over Crawley Town and FA Cup defeat to Burton Albion. However, Inman made his professional senior debut on 4 December 2012, playing 88 minutes in the Football League Trophy fixture against Doncaster Rovers. Four days later on 8 December 2012, he scored his first goal for Crewe Alexandra, in a 3–1 win over Preston North End. Seven days later on 15 December, Inman scored his first in a 1–0 victory over Bury, and was also named Man of the Match. His third goal for the club came on 26 December 2012, in a 2–1 loss against Tranmere Rovers. On 3 January 2013, Inman's loan at Crewe was extended until 11 February. Several weeks later, on 31 January 2013, Inman's loan at Crewe was extended again until the end of the season. Inman contributed for the club by helping them reach the final of the Football League Trophy, scoring once against Bradford City and twice in the first leg against Coventry City. However, during a 3–0 win over Hartlepool United on 26 February 2013, Inman sustained ankle injury that kept him out for two weeks. It wasn't until on 29 March 2013 when he returned from injury, coming on as a substitute for A-Jay Leitch-Smith and scoring in a 2–2 draw against Bury. This was followed up by scoring the only goal of the game with a win against Preston North End. The following week, Inman started in the final before coming off in the 69th minute, in a 2–0 win over Southend United. Having become a first team regular for Crewe Alexandra, he went on to make twenty–six appearances and scoring eight times for the side.

Crewe Alexandra (permanent move)
On 22 August 2013, he signed for Crewe Alexandra in a three-year spell for an undisclosed fee. Following the move, Steve Davis said: "He will be a great asset for the club and he deserves great credit for turning down Newcastle's offer and going into the lower leagues to play regular football. I'm sure there are not many 21-year-olds who could turn down a Premier League club for the bigger picture." However, the move was expected involve tribunal but was avoided in the end.

Inman's first game after signing for the club on a permanent basis came on 24 August 2013 against Leyton Orient, coming on as a substitute in the 69th minute, as Crewe Alexandra lost 2–0. Since joining the club, he became a first team regular for the side, playing in the midfield position. Inman's first goal after signing for the club on a permanent basis came on 12 October 2013 against Preston North End and setting up another goal, in a 2–0 win. However, in November 2013, Davis made Inman and fellow midfielder Anthony Grant available on loan because he was unhappy with their attitude: "Their attitude has got to be better," Davis told BBC Radio Stoke. "For the moment, for the benefit of the squad, they're better not around it." It wasn't until on 14 December 2013 when he returned from the sidelines, coming on as a substitute in the 78th minute, in a 2–2 draw against Coventry City. Since returning to the first team, Inman regained his first team place for the side. He then contributed for Crewe Alexandra, setting up two goals, in a 2–1 win over Colchester United on 29 December 2013, followed up by setting up one of the goals, in a 2–1 win over Carlisle United. Then against Rotherham United on 11 January 2014, Inman scored his second goal of the season, in a 4–2 loss. The following month against Port Vale, Inman scored his third goal of the season, in a 3–1 win. His fourth goal of the season came on 5 April 2014 against Crawley Town, as he scored the club's second goal, which turns out to be a winning goal. Despite the total of missing seven matches during the 2013–14 season, Inman went on to make forty appearances and scoring four times in all competitions.

At the start of the 2014–15 season, Inman started the season well when he scored in a 2–1 loss against Fleetwood Town in the opening game of the season. Two and a half weeks later on 26 August 2014, he scored his second goal of the season, in a 3–2 loss against Bolton Wanderers in the second round of the League Cup. Having initially been included in the starting eleven for the side, Inman soon lost his first team place for the side and was placed on the substitute bench. But he regained his first team place when Manager Davis included Inman, George Cooper and Febian Brandy in a three-man attack, which has proved effective. He later credited sports psychologist, who was bought up by the club, for helping him regain his first team place, as well as, his confidence. However, Inman struggled to score goals on a regular basis for the side. Following the departure of Brandy, ending a three-man attack formation, Inman began to facing new competitions after the club made new signings, resulting him placed on the substitute bench; as well as, his own injury concern, for the rest of the season. At some point in March, Inman was expected to be loaned out but it never materialised and stayed at the club for the rest of the season. At the end of the 2014–15 season, he went on twenty–six appearances and scoring two times in all competitions.

In the 2015–16 season, Inman started the season well when he scored against Coventry City in a 3–2 on 18 August 2015, followed up by scoring in a 3–3 draw against Bury four days later. It came after when Inman impressed the side in the club's pre–season tour. Since the start of the 2015–16 season, Inman regained his first team place for the side, establishing himself in the midfield position and began impressing for the side, playing in the "wide-forward role". It wasn't until on 29 September 2015 when he scored his third goal of the season, in a 2–1 loss against Southend United. Inman was praised by Manager Davis for "finding a good level of consistency in his performances". However, he suffered a knock in mid–November that saw him miss two matches for the side. After returning from injury, Inman was placed on the substitute bench throughout December. He then scored twice in a 4–3 loss against Swindon Town on 16 January 2016, followed up by scoring in a 1–1 draw against Wigan Athletic. Inman later added three goals in three matches between 30 January 2016 and 13 February 2016. His goal scoring form prompted Manager Davis keen on extending Inman's contract at the club. However, he was later sidelined on two occasions with injuries later in the season. Despite this, Inman continued to retain his first team place for the remainder of the season and later scored his tenth goal, which came against Doncaster Rovers on 30 April 2016. Having become the club's best performer in the 2015–16 season, Inman was unable to help the club avoid relegation after losing 3–0 against Port Vale on 9 April 2016, in which he was absent due to injury. Despite this, Inman went on to make forty–two appearances and scoring ten times in all competitions.

At the end of the 2015–16 season, it was announced that the club continued to discuss with Inman over a new contract. But local newspaper Crewe Chronicle expected Inman to leave Crewe Alexandra. Manager Davis later confirmed that Inman will be leaving the club.

Peterborough United
In June 2016, after his contract at Crewe Alexandra ended, Inman joined Peterborough United, signing a three–year contract. Upon joining the club, he was given a number sixteen shirt for the side.

In the club's pre-season at Portugal, Inman was featured two times in a friendly match against Boreham Wood and Norwich City. However, Inman broke his leg in pre-season training and required surgery. By late September, Inman returned to training and began rehabilitating his injury. On 17 November 2016, he returned from injury against Bouremouth's Reserve Team and started and played 70 minutes before being substituted. On 10 December 2016, he finally made his Peterborough United debut, coming on as a late substitute, in a 5–2 win over Chesterfield. Since returning from injury, Inman found himself placed in the substitute bench for the rest of the season. He later contributed three assists, which the first one occurred against Rochdale on 25 February 2017 and then set up two goals in two matches on 11 March 2017 and 14 March 2017 against Oxford United and Chesterfield. At the end of the 2016–17 season, Inman made twelve appearances in all competition at his first season at the club and made only five starts.

Following this, the club placed Inman on a transfer list at the end of the 2016–17 season and at the end of the 2017–18 season. After returning to his parent club at the end of the 2017–18 season, he left the club by mutual consent.

Rochdale (loan spell)
Inman joined Rochdale on loan for the 2017–18 season in June 2017. Upon joining the club, he was given a number seventeen shirt ahead of the new season.

Inman made his Rochdale debut in the first round of the League Cup against Mansfield Town, coming on as a late substitute, in a 1–0 win. A week later on 19 August 2017 against Shrewsbury Town, he made his first start for the side and set up one of the goals, as Rochdale lost 3–2. Since joining the club, Inman quickly became a first team regular for the side, playing in the midfield position.> On 16 September 2017 when he scored his first goal of the season, in a 3–2 loss against Milton Keynes Dons, which was followed up three days later, scoring twice in a 4–0 win over Bury. Inman later added three goals by the end of 2017, including a brace against Bromley in a FA Cup match. Later in the second half of the season, he found himself in a number of matches on the substitute bench. Despite this, Inman played a role when he set up three goals in three matches between 24 March 2018 and 3 April 2018 before scoring his seventh goal of the season, in a 3–3 draw against Portsmouth four days later. He did so once again, setting up two goals in two matches between 21 April 2018 and 24 April 2018 before scoring in a 2–1 loss against Oxford United four days later. At the end of the 2017–18 season, Inman went on to make forty-seven appearances and scoring eight times in all competitions and returned to his parent club following this.

Rochdale (permanent move)
On 4 July 2018, Inman signed for Rochdale on a one-year deal, after he was released from Peterborough United. Upon joining the club, he switched number shirt from seventeen to nineteen.

Inman's first game after signing for the club on a permanent basis came in the opening game of the season, scoring twice, in a 2–1 win over Burton Albion. He initially became a first team regular at the start of the season before not playing for a month throughout September and returned to the first team against Bristol Rovers on 2 October 2018. On 17 November 2018, Inman scored his third goal of the season, in a 3–2 against Shrewsbury Town. He scored the following month on 15 December 2018, in a 2–1 loss against Plymouth Argyle. However, later in the 2018–19 season, Inman's playing time was reduced, as he has made the matchday squad a few occasions he has remained in the substitute bench. Despite this, Inman played in different positions on two occasions later in the season. Inman went on to make twenty–four appearances and scoring four times in all competitions for the side. He was released by Rochdale at the end of the 2018–19 season.

Brisbane Roar
Inman returned to Australia for the first time in a decade by joining A-League side Brisbane Roar on 27 June 2019, managed by new coach Robbie Fowler.

He made his Brisbane Roar debut on 7 August 2019, starting the whole game, in a 2–0 win over Sydney in the round of 32 of the FFA Cup. He then scored his first goal for Brisbane Roar in the Round of 16 of the FFA Cup against Central Coast Mariners, but the club lost 4–2 in penalty shootout after playing 120 minutes in a 2–2 draw.

ATK Mohun Bagan
On 21 September 2020, Inman joined Indian Super League club ATK Mohun Bagan on a one-year deal. Inman was loaned out to Odisha in a swap deal which saw Marcelinho join ATK Mohun Bagan in return for the remainder of the 2020–21 Indian Super League season.

Western United (loan)
On 12 March 2021, Inman returned to Australia signing on loan for A-League club Western United for the remainder of the 2020–21 A-League season. He departed the club at the season's end.

Mumbai City
On 7 September 2021, Inman joined Mumbai City on a one-year deal.

On 1 December, Inman made his debut for the club in the Indian Super League against ATK Mohun Bagan, in a dominant 5–1 win. He came on as a 86th-minute substitute for Cássio Gabriel. He registered his first assist of the season, on 6 February, against Chennaiyin, in a 1–0 win.

He was later included in the club's 2022 AFC Champions League squad. On 11 April, he made his debut in the competition in a historic 2–1 win against Al-Quwa Al-Jawiya, as Mumbai City became the first Indian club to win a AFC Champions League game.

Gold Coast Knights
On 22 February 2023, Inman returned to Australia to join NPL Queensland club Gold Coast Knights.

International career
Although born and raised in Australia, Inman has represented Scotland at youth and under-21 level as he qualifies through his mother. He also eligible to play for England through his father, who was born in England but raised in Australia.

Scotland under-19
Inman was first selected for the Scotland U19 squad in February 2009. He revealed that he rejected a call-up from Australia U20 to join up the Scotland U19 side.

On 25 February 2009, he made his Scotland U21 debut on 25 February 2009, in a 3–2 loss against France U19. Between 10 October 2009 and 12 October 2009, Inman scored two goals in two matches against Romania U19 and Armenia U19. He then scored his third Scotland U19 goal on 21 May 2010, in a 2–1 loss against Belgium U19. Inman was then a regular fixture throughout his time at Scotland U19, as the midfielder gained seven under-19 caps and scoring three goals.

Scotland under-21
During the 2010–11 season, Inman was called up to the Scotland U21 squad in August 2010. He made his debut as a second-half substitute in the 1–1 draw against Sweden U21 and made his full debut in the 3–1 victory over Northern Ireland U21.

Australia
Despite representing Scotland, Inman is still able to play international football at senior level for Australia under FIFA rules on senior allegiance. On 11 May 2016, Inman was called up to the Australian national team for their friendly against England on 27 May 2016. Inman was an unused substitute as Australia lost 2–1.

Personal life
Born in Adelaide, Australia, Inman began playing football when he was six, saying: "I've always just really wanted to play football." He has English and Scottish descent and has three older sisters, two of whom have moved to England.

Career statistics

Club

Honours
Crewe Alexandra
Football League Trophy: 2012–13

Individual
Wor Jackie Award: 2010

References

External links
Profile  at the official Newcastle United website

Scotland stats at Scottish FA

1991 births
Living people
Scottish footballers
Scotland youth international footballers
Scotland under-21 international footballers
Australian soccer players
Association football midfielders
Newcastle United F.C. players
Crewe Alexandra F.C. players
Peterborough United F.C. players
Rochdale A.F.C. players
Brisbane Roar FC players
ATK Mohun Bagan FC players
Odisha FC players
Western United FC players
Gold Coast Knights F.C. players
English Football League players
Australian people of English descent
Australian people of Scottish descent
Australian expatriate sportspeople in India
Australian expatriate soccer players
Indian Super League players
Soccer players from Adelaide
Expatriate footballers in India
Scottish expatriate sportspeople in India
Scottish expatriate footballers